Philippe Clerc (born 24 December 1946) is a former Swiss sprinter who won a bronze and a gold medal in the 100 and 200 m at the 1969 European Athletics Championships, respectively. He competed in these events at the 1972 Summer Olympics, but failed to reach the finals. He was married to English sprinter Janet Simpson, who died of a heart attack on 14 March 2010.

References

1946 births
Living people
Swiss male sprinters
Olympic athletes of Switzerland
Athletes (track and field) at the 1972 Summer Olympics
European Athletics Championships medalists